"Chain Mail" is a song by Mancunian band James, released in March 1986 by Sire Records, the first after the band defected from Factory Records. The record is the band's first single after their first three EPs, and was released in two different versions, as 7-inch and 12-inch singles, with different artworks by John Carroll and, confusingly, under different names. The 12" version was released as "Sit Down, three songs by... James", even though it did not contain the later James hit, "Sit Down", which in 1986 had not been written yet. The only difference between the two versions musically was the inclusion of the song "Uprising" on the 12" version. Neither song made it onto James's debut album, Stutter, although live versions of "Chain Mail" and "Hup-Springs" were later included in the live album One Man Clapping.

Band line up
Tim Booth - vocals
Jim Glennie - bass guitar
Larry Gott - lead guitar
Gavan Whelan - drums

Track listing
7-inch single
 "Chain Mail"
 "Hup-Springs"

12" EP
 "Chain Mail"
 "Uprising" 
 "Hup-Springs"

1986 debut singles
James (band) songs
1986 songs
Song articles with missing songwriters